Herd is a surname. Notable people with the surname include:

Chris Herd, Australian football player
David Herd (anthologist), Scottish anthologist
David Herd (footballer), Scottish former football player
Fred Herd, Scottish professional golfer from St Andrews
Richard Herd (1932–2020), American character actor in television and film
Sandy Herd, Scottish professional golfer from St Andrews
Stan Herd, American earthworks artist from Kansas

Fictional characters:
Gregory Herd, character appearing in Marvel Comics stories

See also
Hurd (surname)